Thomas Raymond O'Callaghan (19 January 1925 – 17 December 2004) was a New Zealand rugby union player. A second five-eighth, O'Callaghan represented Wellington at a provincial level. He was a member of the New Zealand national side, the All Blacks, in 1949, playing a single international match against Australia earning 3 points.

References

1925 births
2004 deaths
People from the West Coast, New Zealand
New Zealand rugby union players
New Zealand international rugby union players
People educated at John Paul II High School, Greymouth
Rugby union fly-halves